Stephen Terry is a professional chef from Wales, who was taught by Marco Pierre White in his kitchen "Harveys" and currently owns, and is Head Chef at, the Hardwick Restaurant in Abergavenny, Wales.  He has a wife and three children.  The Hardwick was awarded a Michelin Bib Gourmand rating in 2011, which was lost in the same year.

His restaurant The Hardwick is managed by his wife Joanna, and is unrecognisable from any of his previous restaurants where he was purely the head chef.

Terry went into business with Francesco Mattioli and bought The Walnut Tree in Abergavenny (previously run by Italian celebrity chef Franco Taruschio) and gained a Michelin star there. However, they decided to go their separate ways and Terry left the business in Francesco Mattioli's hands. However, with the loss of the Michelin-starred chef, the business began to collapse, which led to an episode of "Gordon Ramsay's Kitchen Nightmares" being filmed there.

Terry is mostly known for stints on the BBC programme representing Wales in Great British Menu. He won in the first round in 2008 against Angela Hartnett, and cooked the fish course at the final banquet. In the 2009 series, he was beaten by James Sommerin in the first round.

References

External links 
Profile of Stephen Terry on The Hardwick website
BBC Food bio of Stephen Terry plus some of his recipes

Welsh chefs
Living people
Year of birth missing (living people)